Antonio Pitalúa (born February 21, 1970) is a Colombian-Mexican boxer. His record is 48 wins (42 KO's) and 4 losses. He captured the vacant interim WBC lightweight belt when he ko'd fellow Mexican José Armando Santa Cruz. Six months later he faced unbeaten knockout artist Edwin Valero he was down three times and the fight was stopped 49 seconds into the 2nd round. He bounced back against Puerto Rican Jose Reyes with a knockout in the 6th round.

References

External links 
 

1970 births
Colombian male boxers
Mexican male boxers
Colombian emigrants to Mexico
People from Montería
Living people
Light-welterweight boxers